The Bob Jones Award is the highest honor given by the United States Golf Association in recognition of distinguished sportsmanship in golf. It is named in honor of Bobby Jones.

Winners

1955 Francis Ouimet
1956 William C. Campbell
1957 Babe Zaharias
1958 Margaret Curtis
1959 Findlay S. Douglas
1960 Chick Evans
1961 Joe Carr
1962 Horton Smith
1963 Patty Berg
1964 Charles Coe
1965 Glenna Collett Vare
1966 Gary Player
1967 Richard Tufts
1968 Bob Dickson
1969 Gerald Micklem
1970 Roberto De Vicenzo
1971 Arnold Palmer
1972 Michael Bonallack
1973 Gene Littler
1974 Byron Nelson
1975 Jack Nicklaus
1976 Ben Hogan
1977 Joseph Dey
1978 Bing Crosby and Bob Hope 
1979 Tom Kite
1980 Charlie Yates
1981 JoAnne Carner
1982 Billy Joe Patton
1983 Maureen Ruttle Garrett
1984 Jay Sigel
1985 Fuzzy Zoeller
1986 Jess Sweetser
1987 Tom Watson
1988 Isaac B. Grainger
1989 Chi-Chi Rodríguez
1990 Peggy Kirk Bell
1991 Ben Crenshaw
1992 Gene Sarazen
1993 P. J. Boatwright, Jr.
1994 Lewis Oehmig
1995 Herbert Warren Wind
1996 Betsy Rawls
1997 Fred Brand, Jr.
1998 Nancy Lopez
1999 Ed Updegraff
2000 Barbara McIntire
2001 Tom Cousins
2002 Judy Rankin
2003 Carol Semple Thompson
2004 Jack Burke Jr.
2005 Nick Price
2006 Jay Haas
2007 Louise Suggs
2008 George H. W. Bush
2009 O. Gordon Brewer, Jr.
2010 Mickey Wright
2011 Lorena Ochoa
2012 Annika Sörenstam
2013 Davis Love III
2014 Payne Stewart
2015 Barbara Nicklaus
2016 Judy Bell
2017 Bob Ford
2018 Dennis Walters
2019 Lee Elder
2020 Pak Se-Ri
2021 Bob Lewis
2022 Juli Inkster

References

External links
USGA - Bob Jones Award

Golf awards in the United States
Sportsmanship trophies and awards
Awards established in 1955
1955 establishments in the United States